Powder glass beads are a type of necklace ornamentation. The earliest such beads were discovered during archaeological excavations at Mapungubwe in South Africa, and dated to between 970-1000 CE. Manufacturing of the powder glass beads is now concentrated in West Africa, particularly in the Ghana area. The origins of beadmaking in Ghana are unknown, but the great majority of powder glass beads produced today is made by Ashanti and Krobo craftsmen and women. Krobo bead making has been documented to date from as early as the 1920s but despite limited archaeological evidence, it is believed that Ghanaian powder glass bead making dates further back. Bead making in Ghana was first documented by John Barbot in 1746. Beads still play important roles in Krobo society, be it in rituals of birth, coming of age, marriage, or death.

Powder glass beads are made from finely ground glass, the main source being broken and unusable bottles and a great variety of other scrap glasses. Special glasses such as old cobalt medicine bottles, cold cream jars, and many other types of glasses from plates, ashtrays, window panes - to name only a few - are occasionally bought new, just for the purpose. Pulverized or merely fragmented, and made into beads, these glasses yield particularly bright colours and shiny surfaces. Modern ceramic colourants, finely ground broken beads, or shards of different coloured glasses from various sources can be added to create a great variety of styles, designs and decorative patterns in many different colours. In addition, glass bead fragments of varying sizes, which have traditionally been used for the manufacture as well as for the decoration of specific types of beads, can now be found in interesting new combinations, and during the past few years in particular, bead makers have taken this tradition yet another step forward by using entire, i.e. whole small beads for making their colourful bead creations.

Types of beads

Krobo beads

Krobo powder glass beads are made in vertical molds fashioned out of a special, locally dug clay. Most molds have a number of depressions, designed to hold one bead each, and each of these depressions, in turn, has a small central depression to hold the stem of a cassava leaf. The mold is filled with finely ground glass that can be built up in layers in order to form sequences and patterns of different shapes and colours. The technique could be described as being somewhat similar to creating a sand "painting" or to filling a bottle with different-coloured sands and is called the "vertical-mold dry powder glass technique". When cassava leaf stems are used, these will burn away during firing and leave the bead perforation. Certain powder glass bead variants, however, receive their perforations after firing, by piercing the still hot and pliable glass with a hand-made, pointed metal tool. Firing takes place in clay kilns until the glass fuses.

There are three distinct styles of modern Krobo powder glass beads:  

Fused glass fragment beads which are being made by fusing together fairly large bottle glass or glass bead fragments.  These beads are translucent or semi-translucent and receive their perforations, as well as their final shapes, after firing.  

Beads composed of two halves (usually bicones, occasionally spheres) that are being created from pulverized glass. The two halves are being joined together in a second, short firing process.  
 
The "Mue ne Angma" or "Writing Beads", conventional powder glass beads made from finely ground glass, with glass slurry decorations that are being "written" on and fused in a second firing.

Akoso beads
  
Older Ghanaian dry core powder glass beads, dating from the 1950s, are the Akoso beads, which were also manufactured by the Krobo. The most common colour of Akoso beads is yellow. There are also green, and rarely blue or black specimens. The glass surface is often worn away at the ends and around the beads' equator, exposing a grey core.  The most prevalent decorations, preformed from strips of hot glass, were applied in patterns of criss-crossed loops, longitudinal stripes and circles. Glass from crushed Venetian beads was used for making the glass powder, and the decorative patterns were made of glass derived from Venetian beads, or from small whole Venetian beads such as so-called green heart and white-heart beads.

Meteyi beads

Meteyi beads were made by the Ashanti people of Ghana.  Longitudinal seams that can often be observed on these beads give evidence that they were made in horizontal molds. Meteyi beads are often ellipsoid in cross section and they have a rough surface on the side which touched the bottom of the mold during firing. They can be opaque yellow, and more rarely, green, blue or white, with stripe decorations in combinations of blue, yellow, white or red.  Manufacture ceased during the 1940s.

Ateyun beads

Another West African people known to produce powder glass beads are the Yoruba from Nigeria. Beads from their production differ technically from typical Ghanaian powder glass beads in that they are not made in molds and in the wet-core technique. Finely crushed glass is moistened with water and shaped by hand. The perforations are made before the beads are fired, using a pointed tool. So-called Ateyun beads were made in different shapes but always in red, to imitate real Mediterranean coral. Genuine coral was rare, but very much sought after and highly valued by the Yoruba people. Yoruba bead makers made their own imitations at more affordable prices.

Keta awuazi beads

Apart from red beads imitating coral, blue beads were also highly valued. Keta awuazi beads, originating from Nigeria or possibly Togo, were made in horizontal molds and mold marks are often evident along their sides. Keta awuazi beads are cylindrical in shape. Manufacture ceased during the 1940s.  Krobo bead makers produced similar blue powder glass beads, using glass derived from cold cream jars to achieve the blue colouration.

Kiffa beads
 

Mauritanian Kiffa beads are also manufactured through the wet core technique. Glass, which is finely crushed to a powder, is mixed with a binder such as saliva or gum arabic diluted in water. Decorations are made from the glass slurry i.e. crushed glass mixed with a binder, and applied with a pointed tool, usually a steel needle. The beads are formed by hand and not placed in molds. The firing takes place in small containers, often sardine cans, in open fires.

References

External links
Krobo beadmaker - Nomoda Ebenizer Djaba is a contemporary beadmaker from the Odumasi/Krobo area in Ghana.
African Krobo Beads - Source for history on African beadwork and Krobo beads.
Beadmaking Illustrated - Article and pictures on the art of making traditional glass beads in Ghana.
Glass bead making in Odumase Krobo, Ghana.
Ashanti glass bead making in Daabaa, Ghana.

Glass art
Beadwork